Edward Ford Weber (born July 26, 1931) is an American politician from Ohio. He served one term in the United States House of Representatives as a Republican.

Early life and education 
Weber was born in Toledo, Ohio. He earned a Bachelor of Arts degree from Denison University and a Juris Doctor from Harvard Law School. After graduation, Weber served two years in the United States Army.

Career 
After his discharge in 1958, Weber began to practice law. In 1966, the University of Toledo College of Law hired him as a professor.

In 1980, Weber ran for Ohio's 9th congressional district in the United States House of Representatives. He defeated 26-year incumbent Thomas L. Ashley, chairman of the United States House Committee on Merchant Marine and Fisheries. This was due largely to Ronald Reagan carrying Lucas County, home to Toledo. In 1982, he lost his reelection bid to Marcy Kaptur.

See also
 List of United States representatives from Ohio

References

External links

1931 births
Living people
Politicians from Toledo, Ohio
Military personnel from Ohio
Denison University alumni
Harvard Law School alumni
University of Toledo faculty
Lawyers from Toledo, Ohio
Republican Party members of the United States House of Representatives from Ohio